Orthaga castanealis is a species of snout moth in the genus Orthaga. It was described by George Hamilton Kenrick in 1907, and is known from Papua New Guinea (including Dinawa, the type location).

It has a wingspan of 36 mm.

References

Moths described in 1907
Epipaschiinae
Endemic fauna of Papua New Guinea